The minister of northern affairs is a minister of the Crown in the Canadian Cabinet. The position has been held by Dan Vandal since 20 November 2019.

In 1953, the role of Minister of Northern Affairs and National Resources was created as a formal successor to the Minister of Resources and Development, receiving the previous position's roles with an additional focus on territorial and Inuit relations. Similarly, the Department of Northern Affairs and National Resources was created in the same legislation to replace the previous Department of Resources and Development.

In 1966, the portfolio's responsibilities were divided between the new posts of Minister of Indian Affairs and Northern Development and Minister of Energy, Mines and Resources, which were given the majority of the northern affairs and national resources portfolios, respectively.

In 2019, the northern affairs portfolio of Crown-Indigenous Relations and Northern Affairs Canada (CIRNAC) was assigned back to a separate Minister of Northern Affairs, who works within CIRNAC with the Minister of Crown-Indigenous Relations.

List of ministers

Notes

References

Northern Affairs